Hrvatski nogometni klub Zadar, commonly referred to as HNK Zadar or simply Zadar, is a Croatian professional football club based in the city of Zadar. It currently plays in the Third Football League.

History 
HNK Zadar was founded in 2019 as the informal successor of NK Zadar. The club's first president was former NK Zadar chairman Damir Knežević, while Marko Pinčić was named as head coach.

Pinčić surprisingly resigned from the role, and Josip Butić became the new head coach, as well as Zvonimir Jurić was appointed his assistant.

As of January 8, 2021, the club announced that Želimir Terkeš would become the new head coach, and Dragan Blatnjak his assistant.

Stadium 
The club's home ground is the 3,858-seat Stadion Stanovi.

Managers 
  Marko Pinčić (Jul 21, 2020 – Jul 24, 2020)
  Josip Butić (Jul 25, 2020 – Jan 8, 2021)
  Želimir Terkeš(Jan 8, 2021 – present )

References 

Football clubs in Croatia
Football clubs in Zadar County
Phoenix clubs (association football)
Association football clubs established in 2019
Sport in Zadar
2019 establishments in Croatia